Deoli may refer to:

Places 

 Deoli, Delhi
 Deoli, Maharashtra
 Deoli, Rajasthan
 Deoli, Uttarakhand

Constituencies 

 Deoli (Delhi Assembly constituency)
 Deoli (Maharashtra Vidhan Sabha constituency)

Other use 

 Deoli Irregular Force